For the mountain in Argentina, see Cerro Catedral.

It is located north of Maldonado Department, in the municipality of Aiguá, in a hill range named Sierra Carapé, which constitutes part of a larger range named Cuchilla Grande. Its name derived from the curious forms of the rocky elevations of its summit, which are very common in the southern part of this country.

History
However, in that year, a group of scientists of the Servicio Geográfico Militar (Military Geographic Service) changed the measure of Cerro Catedral.

Geography

Location and geology

Sierra Carapé, formed in Precambrian time, crosses the Maldonado Department from west to east and enters the Rocha Department. It constitutes the border between the departments of Lavalleja and Maldonado. Cerro Catedral, or Cerro Cordillera, is situated in the region of Las Cañas, in the 8th Judicial Section and the 9th Police Section of the Maldonado Department. Near Cerro Catedral there are the source of José Ignacio Stream (Arroyo José Ignacio), which runs from north to south, and the source of Coronilla Stream (Arroyo Coronilla), running to the northwest, which drains into Aiguá.

The hill is situated in an area of the range which its formation is mainly granitic and gneissic.

Vegetation
In the highest areas of Cerro Catedral, the vegetation practically does not exist, with the sparse appearance of a shrub called Myrtus ugni between the rocks.

Climate
The climate in this locality is oceanic (described by the Köppen climate classification as Cfb), with mild to warm summers and chilly to cool winters (with frequent frosts). Strong winds are a common occurrence. The precipitation is evenly distributed throughout the year and snowfalls are uncommon.

See also
Cerro Pan de Azúcar
Geography of Uruguay

Sources
 Cerro Catedral, Site of the Municipality of Maldonado, Uruguay.

References

External links
 

Cerro Catedral
Highest points of countries